The 2016–17 Coupe de France preliminary rounds made up the qualifying competition to decide which teams took part in the main competition from round 7. This was the 100th season of the most prestigious football cup competition of France. The competition was organised by the French Football Federation (FFF) and was open to all clubs in French football, as well as clubs from the overseas departments and territories (Guadeloupe, French Guiana, Martinique, Mayotte, New Caledonia (qualification via 2016 New Caledonia Cup), Tahiti (qualification via 2016 Tahiti Cup), Réunion, and Saint Martin).

The qualifying rounds took place between March and October 2016.

First round

Second round

French Guiana 

These matches were scheduled for 27 August 2016.

Second round results: French Guiana

Note: French Guiana League Structure (no promotion to French League Structure):Division d'Honneur (DH)Promotion d'Honneur (PH)

Guadeloupe 

These matches were played between 26 and 28 August 2016.

Second round results: Guadeloupe

Note: Guadeloupe League Structure (no promotion to French League Structure):Division d'Honneur (DH)Promotion d'Honneur Régionale (PHR)Promotion d'Honneur (PH)Première Division (PD)

Martinique 

These matches were played between 27 August and 1 September 2016.

Second round results: Martinique

Note: Martinique League Structure (no promotion to French League Structure):Ligue Régionale 1 (LR1)Ligue Régionale 2 (LR2)Ligue Régionale 3 (LR3)

Mayotte 

These matches played on 26 March 2016

Second round results: Mayotte

Note: Mayotte League Structure (no promotion to French League Structure):Division d'Honneur (DH)Division d'Honneur Territoriale (DHT)Promotion d'Honneur (PH)

Réunion 

These matches were played between 1 and 3 July 2016.

Second round results: Réunion

Note: Reúnion League Structure (no promotion to French League Structure):Division 1 Régionale (D1R)Division 2 Régionale (D2R)Division 2 Départementale (D2D)Division 3 Départementale (D3D)

Paris-Île-de-France

Picardie

Lorraine

Bourgogne 
These matches were played on 28 August 2016.

Second round results: Bourgogne

Alsace

Auvergne 
These matches were played on 27 and 28 August 2016.

Second round results: Auvergne

Lower Normandy 
These matches were played on 28 August and 3 September 2016.

Second round results: Lower Normandy

Bretagne

Centre-Val de Loire 
These matches were played on 27 and 28 August 2016.

Second round results: Centre-Val de Loire

Centre-West 
These matches were played on 27 and 28 August 2016.

Second round results: Centre-West

Champagne-Ardenne

Franche-Comté 
All but one of these matches were played on 27 and 28 August 2016. The final game was played on 7 September 2016.

Second round results: Franche-Comté

Languedoc-Roussillon 
These matches were played on 27 and 28 August and 4 September 2016.

Second round results: Languedoc-Roussillon

Maine 
These matches were played on 28 August 2016.

Second round results: Maine

Midi-Pyrénées 

The second round in Midi-Pyrénées is organised by individual districts. The matches were played on 26, 27, 28 and 30 August 2016.
Second round results: Midi-Pyrénées

Second round results: Midi-Pyrénées, District de l'Ariège

Second round results: Midi-Pyrénées, District de l'Aveyron

Second round results: Midi-Pyrénées, District de Haute-Garonne Comminges

Second round results: Midi-Pyrénées, District du Gers

Second round results: Midi-Pyrénées, District des Hautes-Pyrénées

Second round results: Midi-Pyrénées, District du Lot

Second round results: Midi-Pyrénées, District du Tarn

Second round results: Midi-Pyrénées, District du Tarn-et-Garonne

Second round results: Midi-Pyrénées, District de Haut-Garonne

Aquitaine 
These matches were played on 3 and 4 September 2016.

Second round results: Aquitaine

Atlantique 
These matches were played on 4 September 2016.

Second round results: Atlantique

Méditerranée 
These matches were played on 4 September 2016.

Second round results: Méditerranée

Nord-Pas de Calais

Normandie 

These matches were played on 4 September 2016.

Second round results: Normandie

Rhône-Alpes 

These matches were played on 3 and 4 September 2016.

Second round results: Rhône-Alpes

Third round

French Guiana 

These matches were played between 28 August and 11 September 2016.

Third round results: French Guiana

Note: French Guiana League Structure (no promotion to French League Structure):Division d'Honneur (DH)Promotion d'Honneur (PH)

Guadeloupe 

These matches were played between 9 and 11 September 2016.

Third round results: Guadeloupe

Note: Guadeloupe League Structure (no promotion to French League Structure):Division d'Honneur (DH)Promotion d'Honneur Régionale (PHR)Promotion d'Honneur (PH)Première Division (PD)

Martinique 

These matches were played between 2 September and 10 September 2016.

Third round results: Martinique

Note: Martinique League Structure (no promotion to French League Structure):Ligue Régionale 1 (LR1)Ligue Régionale 2 (LR2)Ligue Régionale 3 (LR3)

Mayotte 

These matches played on 24 April 2016

Third round results: Mayotte

Note: Mayotte League Structure (no promotion to French League Structure):Division d'Honneur (DH)Division d'Honneur Territoriale (DHT)Promotion d'Honneur (PH)

Réunion 

These matches were played on 20 and 21 August 2016.

Third round results: Réunion

Note: Reúnion League Structure (no promotion to French League Structure):Division 1 Régionale (D1R)Division 2 Régionale (D2R)Division 2 Départementale (D2D)Division 3 Départementale (D3D)

Paris-Île-de-France

Picardie

Lorraine

Bourgogne 
These matches were played on 10 and 11 September 2016.

Third round results: Bourgogne

Alsace

Auvergne 
These matches were played on 10 and 11 September 2016.

Third round results: Auvergne

Lower Normandy 
These matches were played on 10 and 11 September 2016.

Third round results: Lower Normandy

Bretagne

Centre-Val de Loire 
These matches were played on 10 and 11 September 2016.

Third round results: Centre-Val de Loire

Centre-West 
These matches were played on 10 and 11 September 2016.

Third round results: Centre-West

Champagne-Ardenne

Corsica 
The Preliminary rounds in Corsica started with the third round due to the relatively low number of teams competing.

These matches were played on 11 September 2016.

Third round results: Corsica

Franche-Comté 
All but one of these matches were played on 10 and 11 September 2016.

Third round results: Franche-Comté

Languedoc-Roussillon 
These matches were played on 10 and 11 September 2016.

Third round results: Languedoc-Roussillon

Maine 
These matches were played on 10 and 11 September 2016.

Third round results: Maine

Midi-Pyrénées 

These matches were played on 10 and 11 September 2016.

Third round results: Midi-Pyrénées

Aquitaine 
These matches were played on 10 and 11 September 2016.

Third round results: Aquitaine

Atlantique 
These matches were played on 10 and 11 September 2016.

Third round results: Atlantique

Méditerranée 
These matches were played on 10 and 11 September 2016.

Third round results: Méditerranée

Nord-Pas de Calais

Normandie 

These matches were played on 11 September 2016.

Third round results: Normandie

Rhône-Alpes 

These matches were played on 10 and 11 September 2016.

Third round results: Rhône-Alpes

Fourth round

French Guiana 

These matches were played between 22 and 25 September 2016.

Fourth round results: French Guiana

Note: French Guiana League Structure (no promotion to French League Structure):Division d'Honneur (DH)Promotion d'Honneur (PH)

Guadeloupe 

These matches were played on 23 and 24 September 2016.

Fourth round results: Guadeloupe

Note: Guadeloupe League Structure (no promotion to French League Structure):Division d'Honneur (DH)Promotion d'Honneur Régionale (PHR)Promotion d'Honneur (PH)Première Division (PD)

Martinique 

These matches were played on 16 and 17 September 2016.

Fourth round results: Martinique

Note: Martinique League Structure (no promotion to French League Structure):Ligue Régionale 1 (LR1)Ligue Régionale 2 (LR2)Ligue Régionale 3 (LR3)

Mayotte 

These matches played on 4 June 2016

Fourth round results: Mayotte

Note: Mayotte League Structure (no promotion to French League Structure):Division d'Honneur (DH)Division d'Honneur Territoriale (DHT)Promotion d'Honneur (PH)

Réunion 

These matches were played on 17 and 18 September 2016.

Fourth round results: Réunion

Note: Reúnion League Structure (no promotion to French League Structure):Division 1 Régionale (D1R)Division 2 Régionale (D2R)Division 2 Départementale (D2D)Division 3 Départementale (D3D)

Paris-Île-de-France 
These matches were played on 24 and 25 September 2016.

Fourth round results: Île-de-France

Picardie

Lorraine

Bourgogne 
These matches were played on 24 and 25 September 2016.

Fourth round results: Bourgogne

Alsace

Auvergne 
These matches were played on 24 and 25 September 2016.

Fourth round results: Auvergne

Lower Normandy 
These matches were played on 24 and 25 September 2016.

Fourth round results: Lower Normandy

Bretagne

Centre-Val de Loire 
These matches were played on 24 and 25 September 2016.

Fourth round results: Centre-Val de Loire

Centre-West 
These matches were played on 23, 24 and 25 September 2016.

Fourth round results: Centre-West

Champagne-Ardenne

Corsica 
These matches were played on 25 September 2016.

Fourth round results: Corsica

Franche-Comté 
These matches were played on 24 and 25 September 2016.

Fourth round results: Franche-Comté

Languedoc-Roussillon 
These matches were played on 24 and 25 September 2016.

Fourth round results: Languedoc-Roussillon

Maine 
These matches were played on 24 and 25 September 2016.

Fourth round results: Maine

Midi-Pyrénées 

These matches were played on 23, 24 and 25 September 2016.

Fourth round results: Midi-Pyrénées

Aquitaine 
These matches were played on 24 and 25 September 2016.

Fourth round results: Aquitaine

Atlantique 
These matches were played on 24 and 25 September 2016.

Fourth round results: Atlantique

Méditerranée 
These matches were played on 24 and 25 September 2016.

Fourth round results: Méditerranée

Nord-Pas de Calais

Normandie 

These matches were played on 24 and 25 September 2016.

Fourth round results: Normandie

Rhône-Alpes 

These matches were played on 24 and 25 September 2016.

Fourth round results: Rhône-Alpes

Fifth round

French Guiana 

These matches were played on 15 and 16 October 2016.

Fifth round results: French Guiana

Note: French Guiana League Structure (no promotion to French League Structure):Division d'Honneur (DH)Promotion d'Honneur (PH)

Guadeloupe 

These matches were played on 8 October 2016.

Fifth round results: Guadeloupe

Note: Guadeloupe League Structure (no promotion to French League Structure):Division d'Honneur (DH)Promotion d'Honneur Régionale (PHR)Promotion d'Honneur (PH)Première Division (PD)

Martinique 

These matches were played on 27 September and 8 October 2016.

Fifth round results: Martinique

Note: Martinique League Structure (no promotion to French League Structure):Ligue Régionale 1 (LR1)Ligue Régionale 2 (LR2)Ligue Régionale 3 (LR3)

Mayotte 

These matches were played on 10 September 2016

Fifth round results: Mayotte

Note: Mayotte League Structure (no promotion to French League Structure):Division d'Honneur (DH)Division d'Honneur Territoriale (DHT)Promotion d'Honneur (PH)

Réunion 

These matches were played on 8 and 9 October 2016.

Fifth round results: Réunion

Note: Reúnion League Structure (no promotion to French League Structure):Division 1 Régionale (D1R)Division 2 Régionale (D2R)Division 2 Départementale (D2D)Division 3 Départementale (D3D)

Paris-Île-de-France

Picardie

Lorraine

Bourgogne 
These matches were played on 8 and 9 October 2016.

Fifth round results: Bourgogne

Alsace

Auvergne 
These matches were played on 8 and 9 October 2016.

Fifth round results: Auvergne

Lower Normandy 
These matches were played on 8 and 9 October 2016.

Fifth round results: Lower Normandy

Bretagne

Centre-Val de Loire 
These matches were played on 7, 8 and 9 October 2016.

Fifth round results: Centre-Val de Loire

Centre-West 
These matches were played on 8 and 9 October 2016.

Fifth round results: Centre-West

Champagne-Ardenne

Corsica 
These matches were played on 9 October 2016.

Fifth round results: Corsica

Franche-Comté 
These matches were played on 8 and 9 October 2016.

Fifth round results: Franche-Comté

Languedoc-Roussillon 
These matches were played on 9 October 2016.

Fifth round results: Languedoc-Roussillon

Maine 
These matches were played on 8 and 9 October 2016.

Fifth round results: Maine

Midi-Pyrénées 

These matches were played on 8 and 9 October 2016.

Fifth round results: Midi-Pyrénées

Aquitaine 
These matches were played on 8 and 9 October 2016.

Fifth round results: Aquitaine

Atlantique 
These matches were played on 8 and 9 October 2016.

Fifth round results: Atlantique

Méditerranée 
These matches were played on 8 and 9 October 2016.

Fifth round results: Méditerranée

Nord-Pas de Calais

Normandie 

These matches were played on 8 and 9 October 2016.

Fifth round results: Normandie

Rhône-Alpes 

These matches were played on 8 and 9 October 2016.

Fifth round results: Rhône-Alpes

Sixth round

French Guiana 

These matches were played on 20 and 21 October 2016.

Guadeloupe 

These matches were played on 21 and 22 October 2016.

Martinique 

These matches were played on 18 and 19 October 2016.

Mayotte 

This match was played on 16 October 2016.

Réunion 

This match was played on 23 October 2016. Both teams qualified for the 7th round.

Alsace 
These matches were played on 22 and 23 October 2016.

Aquitaine 
These matches were played on 22 and 23 October 2016.

Atlantique 
These matches were played on 22 and 23 October 2016.

Auvergne 
These matches were played on 22 and 23 October 2016.

Lower Normandy 
These matches were played on 22 October 2016.

Bretagne 

These matches were played on 22 and 23 October 2016.

Bourgogne 
These matches were played on 22 and 23 October 2016.

Centre-Val de Loire 
These matches were played on 22 and 23 October 2016.

Centre-West 
These matches were played on 22 and 23 October 2016.

Champagne-Ardenne 

These matches were played on 22 and 23 October 2016.

Corsica 
These matches were played on 23 October 2016.

Franche-Comté 
These matches were played on 22 and 23 October 2016.

Languedoc-Roussillon 
These matches were played on 22 and 23 October 2016.

Lorraine 
These matches were played on 22 and 23 October 2016.

Maine 
These matches were played on 22 and 23 October 2016.

Méditerranée 
These matches were played on 22 and 23 October 2016.

Midi-Pyrénées 

These matches were played on 22 and 23 October 2016.

Nord-Pas de Calais 

These matches were played on 22 and 23 October 2016.

Normandie 

These matches were played on 23 October 2016.

Paris-Île-de-France 
These matches were played on 22 and 23 October 2016.

Picardie 
These matches were played on 22 and 23 October 2016.

Rhône-Alpes 

These matches were played on 22 and 23 October 2016.

References

Preliminary rounds